Anderby Creek is a small holiday village in Lincolnshire, England, to the north of Skegness.

History
There is archaeological evidence of a medieval harbour on the original creek, before it was canalised.

During World War II RAF Anderby Creek was home to the first battle training school of the Royal Air Force Regiment.  There was also a searchlight battery.

Geography
There is a long sandy beach at Anderby Creek, between Sandilands and Mablethorpe to the north and Chapel St Leonards and Skegness to the south.

Landmarks
One  of the more unusual tourist attractions on the Lincolnshire coast is the Cloud Bar at Anderby Creek. The "world's first official cloud spotting area" was the work of Manchester artist Michael Trainor.

Anderby Creek is known for its caravan parks and holiday retreats, with Anderby Springs Caravan Park, Beachside Caravan Park, Rose's Family Caravan Park, Sandy Feet Retreat, Moggs Retreat and Seaside Lodge among others located here. In 1981 there were about 560 caravans and 60 chalets in Anderby Creek.

Anderby Creek has been recognised as one of the UK’s top 40 beaches, The Times 1 May 2021. “Forget busy Skegness and visit one of Lincolnshire’s quiet, unspoilt sections of coastline”

The Anderby Drainage Museum is in pumping station houses on Anderby Drain in the hamlet, which were built in 1945. Two station houses contain two Ruston 10HRC twin cylinder oil engines, which were installed to drain 9200 acres of land. The museum contains numerous artifacts on display such as old drainage tools, photographs and documents.

References

External links

Hamlets in Lincolnshire
East Lindsey District
Populated coastal places in Lincolnshire